Bill Watson (born 7 January 1949) is a former Scotland international rugby union player.

Rugby union career

Amateur career
Watson played for Boroughmuir.

Provincial career
He played for Edinburgh District.

International career
Watson was capped by Scotland 'B' once against France 'B' in 1971.

He played for Scotland ten times, from 1974 to 1979. He was the Boroughmuir club's second Scotland international player (after Ken Ross in 1961).

Administrative career
Watson was a Director and then Chief Executive at the Scottish Rugby Union from 2000 to 2003. He was sacked as Chief Executive in 2003 as part of management shake-up. It came after under-performance from the national team and the professional clubs. Earlier that year Glasgow Warriors lost Jason White to Sale Sharks with Watson admitting that the Warriors could not compete with the English club in the cash stakes.

He was a Director at Boroughmuir from 2012 to 2019. He handed over the role of director of finance to Alice Shek in 2018, becoming vice president of the club.

It was while Watson was a director of the club that Boroughmuir instigated the Bill Watson Youth Rugby Bursary Programme. It was backed by the Microtech Group in a four year deal. It was to cover all the costs of playing rugby for the youngsters, including touring. Watson stated:
I’m delighted that we can actively support the next generation of talented young people to get as much enjoyment out of rugby as I have, without any financial worries. The support from Microtech Group will go a long way in helping our young talent to fulfill their potential, whether that’s playing rugby for pleasure or going on to play the game professionally.

Family
Watson's brother George Watson played as Lock. He also played at Boroughmuir and was capped by Edinburgh District. Unlucky not to receive a full senior cap for Scotland, he was named in Alan Lorimer's selection for Scotland's best uncapped team.

References

1949 births
Living people
Scottish rugby union players
Scotland international rugby union players
Boroughmuir RFC players
Scotland 'B' international rugby union players
Edinburgh District (rugby union) players
Rugby union players from Edinburgh
Rugby union number eights